Baglan railway station is a minor station in the village of Baglan in Neath Port Talbot county borough, south Wales. It is a stop on the South Wales Main Line, served by Transport for Wales Swanline regional trains between Swansea and Cardiff.

It is a relatively new station, opened in 1996. The station is located at street level but passenger access is from the Seaway Parade flyover. It is close to Neath Port Talbot Hospital.

Facilities
The station has 2 platforms:
Platform 1, for westbound trains towards Swansea
Platform 2, for eastbound trains towards Cardiff Central

The station is unmanned - there is no ticket office nor are there any platform entry barriers. Passengers must purchase tickets on board trains.

Services
The typical service pattern is one train approximately every two hours in each direction (with extras at weekday peak times). Some westbound trains continue on to Carmarthen and Milford Haven whilst some eastbound trains are extended to Newport, Hereford and Manchester Piccadilly. The current Sunday service is very limited, with just two trains each way calling. A normal weekday service operates on most Bank Holidays.

References

External links

Railway stations opened by Railtrack
DfT Category F1 stations
Railway stations in Great Britain opened in 1996
Railway stations in Neath Port Talbot
South Wales Main Line
Railway stations served by Transport for Wales Rail